Elizabeth Anne Velásquez (born March 13, 1989) is an American motivational speaker, activist, author, and YouTuber. She was born with an extremely rare congenital disease called Marfanoid–progeroid–lipodystrophy syndrome that, among other symptoms, prevents her from accumulating body fat and gaining weight. Her conditions resulted in bullying during her childhood. During her teenage years, she faced cyberbullying, which ultimately inspired her to take up motivational speaking.

Early life
The eldest of three children born to Rita and Guadalupe Velásquez, Lizzie was born on March 13, 1989, in Austin, Texas. She was born four weeks prematurely and weighed less than 2 pounds 11 ounces (1,219 grams).

Velásquez studied at Texas State University until late 2012, majoring in communication studies. She is a Roman Catholic and has said of her faith, "It's been my rock through everything, just having the time to be alone and pray and talk to God and know that He's there for me."

Condition
Velásquez's condition is a very rare, previously undiagnosed and non-terminal genetic disorder. Her condition bears similarities to many other conditions, especially progeria. Medical researchers at the University of Texas Southwestern Medical Center previously speculated that it may be a form of neonatal progeroid syndrome (NPS) (Wiedemann-Rautenstrauch syndrome), which does not affect Velásquez's healthy bones, organs, and teeth.

Velásquez is medically unable to gain weight, which is a hallmark of her rare disorder. She has never weighed more than 29 kg (64 lbs), and reportedly has almost 0% body fat. Moreover, she is required to eat many small meals and snacks throughout the day, averaging between 5,000 and 8,000 calories daily. Additionally, she is blind in her right eye, which began to cloud over when she was four, and she is vision-impaired in her left eye.

Around 2015, it was revealed that Velásquez and another woman named Abby Solomon, with a similar but less severe variant of the condition, have mutations in the FBN1 gene, which encodes the proprotein of the novel hormone asprosin, and that this mutation results in asprosin deficiency and is responsible for their conditions. The condition is specifically called Marfanoid–progeroid–lipodystrophy syndrome or simply Marfan lipodystrophy syndrome.

Career
Ever since she was dubbed the "World's Ugliest Woman" in a video posted on YouTube in 2006, when she was 17, Velásquez has spoken out against bullying. In January 2014 she gave a TEDxAustinWomen Talk titled "How Do YOU Define Yourself" and her YouTube videos have received over 54 million views. She is known for her optimism. For  in 2015, she hosted a social media challenge for Bystander Revolution's Month of Action.

Her first work, co-authored with her mother, Rita, is a self-published autobiography published in 2010 in English and Spanish. It is called Lizzie Beautiful: The Lizzie Velásquez Story and includes letters Velásquez's mother wrote to her as a child.

Velásquez has also written two books directed at kids, which share personal stories and offer advice. Be Beautiful, Be You (2012) shares her journey "to discover what truly makes us beautiful, and teaches readers to recognize their unique gifts and blessings". The book is also available in Spanish as Sé bella, sé tú misma (2013). Another book, Choosing Happiness (2014), talks about some of the obstacles Velásquez has faced and how she "learned the importance of choosing to be happy when it's all too easy to give up". Both books were published by a Redemptorist publishing house, Liguori Publications.

Dare to be Kind, first published in 2017, is about the importance of being kind, gleaned from her first-hand experience being bullied personally and online.

A documentary film titled A Brave Heart: The Lizzie Velásquez Story premiered at SXSW on March 14, 2015. The movie aired on Lifetime on October 17, 2016.

Velásquez began starring on her own Fullscreen original series titled Unzipped since April 2017.

See also
 Hayley Okines — English girl who had progeria and was the subject of television specials both in Europe and in the United States.
 Sam Berns — American male with progeria who was the only child of the doctors who established the Progeria Research Foundation.

References

External links
 
 Velásquez, Lizzie (December 20, 2013). "How Do YOU Define Yourself Lizzie Velasquez at TEDxAustinWomen". YouTube.
 Adams, Sam (March 14, 2015). "Lizzie Velasquez: Woman labelled 'ugliest in the world' by online bullies fights back with film about her life'. Daily Mirror.
 Hurst, Samantha (May 14, 2014). "'The Lizzie Project' Surpasses $180k Goal on Kickstarter". Crowdfund Insider.

1989 births
Living people
21st-century American women writers
American bloggers
Women human rights activists
American people with disabilities
American motivational speakers
Women motivational speakers
Blind writers
American disability rights activists
Writers from Austin, Texas
Hispanic and Latino American writers
Victims of cyberbullying
Texas State University alumni
Anti-bullying activists
American autobiographers
Women autobiographers
American women bloggers
American women non-fiction writers
21st-century American non-fiction writers
Catholics from Texas
American blind people
Blind activists